Pimolrat Pisolyabutr Born June
3, 1983 in Bangkok Thailand is a Thai actress. She is best known by her nickname Kob (กบ)

Filmography

As actress

External links
 

Pimolrat Pisolyabutr
Living people
1983 births